Tessa Johanna van Schagen (born  2 February 1994) is a Dutch athlete who specialises in sprinting. She competed in the 4 × 100 m event at the 2016 European Championships in Amsterdam, Netherlands, where she won the gold medal.

International competitions

1Did not finish in the final

Personal bests

Outdoor

Indoor

References

External links 

 

1994 births
Living people
Sportspeople from Leiden
Dutch female sprinters
European Athletics Championships medalists
Athletes (track and field) at the 2016 Summer Olympics
Olympic athletes of the Netherlands
Dutch Athletics Championships winners
Olympic female sprinters
20th-century Dutch women
20th-century Dutch people
21st-century Dutch women